The Gaels are a European ethnolinguistic group.

Gael or Gaels may also refer to:

People
 Gaël (given name), a list of people with the personal name
 Anna Gaël, stage name of Hungarian actress Anna Thynn, Marchioness of Bath (born 1943)
 Barent Gael (c. 1630–1698), Dutch landscape painter
 Josseline Gaël (1917–1995), French film actress born Jeannine Augustine Jeanne Blanleuil
 Gael (footballer), Equatoguinean footballer

Sports
Clarington Green Gaels, lacrosse team in Ontario, Canada
Iona Gaels, athletic teams of Iona University in New York
Queen's Golden Gaels, athletic teams of Queen's University at Kingston in Ontario, Canada
Saint Mary's Gaels, athletic teams of Saint Mary's College of California

Other uses
 Gaël, a commune in Brittany, France
 Gael Airfield, an abandoned World War II military airfield near the commune
 Gael (magazine), a monthly women's magazine in Belgium
 Iona Gaels, the athletics teams of Iona College, in New Rochelle, New York
 PS Gael (1867), a passenger paddle steamer
 "The Gael", a 1990 piece of music by Dougie MacLean

See also
 Ralph de Gael (before 1042–c. 1096), Earl of East Anglia and Lord of Gaël and Montfort, leader of the last serious revolt against William the Conqueror